These People is the fourth studio album from British singer and musician, Richard Ashcroft. The album was released on 20 May 2016 through Righteous Phonographic Association, Cooking Vinyl and Harvest Records. This is his first solo album since his 2010's solo project album, United Nations of Sound, and also his first main studio album since 2006's, Keys to the World.

Critical reception

These People received generally mixed-to-favourable reviews from music critics. At Metacritic, which assigns a normalized rating out of 100 to reviews from mainstream critics, the album received an average score of 51 based on 15 reviews.

Track listing 

 Japanese bonus tracks

Personnel
Richard Ashcroft - vocals, guitar, bass, keyboards, drums, programming
Steve Wyreman, Adam Phillips - guitar
Chris Potter, Damon Minchella - bass
Geoff Dugmore - drums
Steve Sidelnyk - drums, programming
Mirwais Ahmadzaï - keyboards, programming on "Out of My Body"
Roy Kerr - additional programming on "Out of My Body"
Wil Malone - string arrangements
Perry Montague-Mason - string leader

Charts

References

External links 

2016 albums
Richard Ashcroft albums
Albums produced by Chris Potter (record producer)
Cooking Vinyl albums